Einstein is a 1974 opera by Paul Dessau to a libretto by Karl Mickel. It premiered 16 February 1974.

Recording
Theo Adam, conducted Otmar Suitner

References

Operas by Paul Dessau
German-language operas
Operas
1974 operas